2 Rats is a 2003 Nigerian comedy film directed by Andy Chukwu.

Nollywood's highest-paid actors, Osita Iheme (A-boy) and Chinedu Ikedieze (Bobo) play two young boys whose father has been murdered by their uncle. In a selfish move, Amaechi Muonagor wants them to work as house boys in their father's own house. This film is most prominently depicting 2 boys named A-boy and Bobo, as they explored the tribulations of casting aside their friends and family for a savvy entrepreneur that promised them large fortunes in return for their labour. The deception and lies that came from this story contained the message of "don't dog the boys". A-boy and Bobo have other plans. The film features performances by Aki and Pawpaw.

Cast
 Amaechi Muonagor
 Osita Iheme
 Chinedu Ikedieze
 Patience Ozokwor
 Andy Chukwu
 Prince Nwafor
 David Ihesie   
 Ricky Eze.
 Atitebi haleemah. Tiwalade

See also
 List of Nigerian films of 2003

References

External links 
 

Nigerian comedy films
2003 comedy films
2003 films
2000s English-language films
English-language Nigerian films